Miguel Loureiro Ameijenda (born 21 November 1996) is a Spanish footballer who plays as a right-back for CD Lugo.

Club career
Born in Cerceda, A Coruña, Galicia, Loureiro made his senior debut with Bergantiños FC on 24 August 2013 at the age of 16, starting in a 2–1 away win against CA Rivera for the Preferente Gallega championship. He scored his first senior goal on 1 December, netting the first in a 1–1 home draw against CF Dumbría.

On 21 July 2014, Loureiro joined Celta de Vigo, returning to youth football. On 25 August of the following year, after being deemed surplus to requirements, he signed for Pontevedra CF, being initially assigned to the reserves.

On 15 June 2016 Loureiro renewed with the Granates, and became an undisputed starter for the first team in Segunda División B during the season, as his side reached the play-offs. On 2 July of the following year, he signed a three-year contract with Segunda División side Córdoba CF.

Loureiro made his professional debut on 6 September 2017, starting in a 4–2 away defeat of Lorca FC, for the season's Copa del Rey. On 26 June 2019, after suffering relegation, he terminated his contract, and joined FC Andorra in the third division on 9 August.

On 21 June 2021, Loureiro signed for Racing de Ferrol in the newly-formed Primera División RFEF. On 1 August of the following year, he returned to the second division after agreeing to a two-year contract with CD Lugo.

References

External links

1996 births
Living people
People from Ordes (comarca)
Sportspeople from the Province of A Coruña
Spanish footballers
Footballers from Galicia (Spain)
Association football defenders
Segunda División players
Primera Federación players
Segunda División B players
Divisiones Regionales de Fútbol players
Bergantiños FC players
Pontevedra CF footballers
Córdoba CF players
FC Andorra players
Racing de Ferrol footballers
CD Lugo players
Spanish expatriate footballers
Spanish expatriate sportspeople in Andorra
Expatriate footballers in Andorra